Kathleen Lockhart (née Arthur; 9 August 1894 – 18 February 1978) was a prolific English-American actress during the early-mid 20th century.

Early life 
Kathleen Arthur was born on August 9, 1894 in Southsea, Hampshire, England.

Career 
Lockhart's entertainment career began on the stage in Britain.

Lockhart appeared on stage and in Hollywood films for almost forty years. Lockhart has more than 30 film credits.

Lockhart and her husband, Gene, occasionally starred opposite each other, most notably as Mr. and Mrs. Bob Cratchit in A Christmas Carol (1938). Lockhart's daughter, June also appeared with them in that film, portraying their daughter.

After 1957, Lockhart retired from acting and made no more film appearances, except for a small role in The Purple Gang (1960).

Lockhart has a star on the Hollywood Walk of Fame at 6241 Hollywood Boulevard.

Personal life 
In 1924, Lockhart immigrated to the United States.
Lockhart's husband was Gene Lockhart (died 1957), an actor. Lockhart had a daughter June Lockhart. Lockhart's granddaughter is Anne Lockhart.

On February 18, 1978, Lockhart died in Los Angeles, California following a long illness. Lockhart is buried at Holy Cross Cemetery in Culver City.

Partial filmography

1936: Brides Are Like That - Mrs. Ella Robinson
1936: Times Square Playboy - Lottie Bancroft.
1936: The Devil is a Sissy - Mrs. Murphy
1936: Mr. Cinderella - Aunt Penelope 'Penny' Winfield.
1936: Career Woman - Mrs. Milt Clark
1937: Something to Sing About - Miss Amy Robbins
1938: Men Are Such Fools - Mrs. Dalton
1938: Penrod's Double Trouble - Mrs. Laura Schofield
1938: Give Me a Sailor - Mrs. Hawks (scenes deleted)
1938: Blondie - Mrs. Miller
1938: A Christmas Carol - Mrs. Cratchit
1938: Sweethearts - Aunt Amelia
1939: What a Life - Mrs. Pike
1939: Man of Conquest - Mrs. Allen
1939: Outside These Walls - Miss Thornton
1939: Our Leading Citizen - Mrs. Barker
1939: What a Life - Miss Pike
1941: Love Crazy - Mrs. Bristol
1942: Are Husbands Necessary? - Laura Atterbury
1943: Mission to Moscow - Lady Chilston (uncredited)
1943: The Good Fellows - Mary Hilton
1943: Lost Angel - Mrs. Catty
1945: Roughly Speaking - Mrs. Henrietta Louise Randall
1945: Bewitched - Mrs. Ann Ellis
1946: Two Years Before the Mast - Mrs. Gordon Stewart (uncredited)
1946: The Strange Woman - Mrs. Partridge
1946: Lady in the Lake - Mrs. Grayson
1947: Mother Wore Tights - Mrs. Clarkman (uncredited)
1947: Gentleman's Agreement - Mrs. Jessie Minify (uncredited)
1949: The Sickle or the Cross - Martha Deems
1950: The Big Hangover - Mrs. Parkford (uncredited)
1951: I'd Climb the Highest Mountain - Mrs. Brock
1952: Plymouth Adventure - Mary Brewster (uncredited)
1953: Confidentially Connie - Mrs. Martha Magruder
1953: Walking My Baby Back Home - Mrs. Millard
1953: The Glenn Miller Story - Mrs. Miller
1960: The Purple Gang - Nun (final film role)

See also 

 List of stars on the Hollywood Walk of Fame

References

External links

 
 
 
 
Go Abroad with the Lockharts on The Digital Deli Too -- information about a radio program that starred Gene Lockhart and his wife, Kathleen.

1894 births
1978 deaths
People from Southsea
People with acquired American citizenship
American film actresses
American stage actresses
British film actresses
British stage actresses
Burials at Holy Cross Cemetery, Culver City
Actresses from Hampshire
20th-century English actresses
British emigrants to the United States
20th-century American actresses